New Era is an unincorporated community in Concordia Parish, Louisiana, United States. The community is located at the western edge of Concordia Parish on LA 129.

History
During the Antebellum period New Era was a small town on the Black River that served as a landing for steam boats. The steam boats would offload passengers and trade with nearby settlements. It was also the site of Pleasant Cottage plantation which was burned down during the Civil War.

References

Unincorporated communities in Concordia Parish, Louisiana
Unincorporated communities in Louisiana
Unincorporated communities in Natchez micropolitan area